The Oamaru by-election of 1923 was a by-election during the 21st New Zealand Parliament. The by-election was called following the invalidation of the preceding 1922 general election result due to irregularities. It was held on 1 May 1923.

Background
When the preliminary counts for the 1922 general election in the  electorate were announced, Ernest Lee was ahead of John Andrew MacPherson by just one vote. Once the absentee votes had been counted, it was announced that MacPherson was leading by five votes, but this was subsequently increased to 25 votes. A recount was ordered, during which some irregularities came to light, and Lee asked for a judicial review. The court case was heard at the Supreme Court in Wellington by Sir Robert Stout and Justice Alexander Samuel Adams, who declared the election void and ordered the parties to pay their own expenses.

Candidates
Two candidates contested the seat. John Andrew MacPherson (Liberal Party), who had taken the seat off the incumbent Ernest Lee (Reform Party), again won the vote.

Result
The following table gives the election results:

MacPherson won the by-election. At the subsequent general election in 1925, Lee in turn defeated MacPherson.

Notes

References

Oamaru 1923
1923 elections in New Zealand
Politics of Otago